The Battle of Blar na Pairce ( "Battle of the Park") was a Scottish clan battle that took place just outside Strathpeffer some time between 1485 and 1491. It was fought between men of the Clan Donald or MacDonald and the Clan Mackenzie (led by Kenneth Mackenzie).

The chief of Clan Donald, Lord of the Isles, had resigned the title of Earl of Ross to the king in 1477. After this the province of Ross was constantly invaded by the MacDonald islanders. As a result, a battle was fought between the Clan Donald islanders, led by Gillespick MacDonald against the Clan MacKenzie. The MacDonald islanders were defeated with many men being drowned in the River Conon.

References

Bibliography

15th-century Scottish clan battles
1477 in Scotland
Clan Mackenzie
Conflicts in 1477